TLVFest or the Tel Aviv International LGBT Film Festival is an annual film festival held in Tel Aviv, Israel. The festival is focused on LGBT themed film from around the world.

The festival, based at the Tel Aviv Cinematheque. is open to all types of audiences, not only to members of the LGBTQ community.

The festival is increasingly active outside Tel Aviv, and bringing LGBTQ culture across the country: like Sderot, Beer Sheva, Haifa, Jerusalem, Kibbutz Mizra, Rosh Pina, the Jordan Valley, Nes Tziona, Pardes Hanna, Karkur,

The festival runs around the same time as, sometimes concurrently, with Tel Aviv Pride.

In 2020, due to COVID-19, the festival moved to November.

History
The first ever LGBT (lesbian, gay, bisexual, and transsexual) film festival in Tel Aviv was held in 2006, and focused on LGBT-themed films would otherwise never get theatrical, TV or DVD distribution in Israel. The festival took place at the Ha’ozen Hashlishit (Third Ear) music venue on King George Street and screened in five tiny theaters of 20–40 seats each.
The festival opened with Greg Araki’s Mysterious Skin and the festival sold out every film, attracting more than 2,000 people.

The festival moved to the bigger Tel Aviv Cinematheque in 2007.

Guests
Over the years, the festival's guests have included Alan Cumming, Lea DeLaria, film producer Christine Vachon (Boys Don’t Cry, Carol, Far From Heaven); LGBT community 'legends' such as Bruce La Bruce, John Waters-star Mink Stole, Wieland Speck (Berlinale Panorama curator), Michael Stutz, Kim Yutani (director of programming for the Sundance Film Festival), Lorenzo Vigas (Golden Lion Award Winner/Venice Film Festival – From Afar), Marcio Reolon, Filipe Matzembacher (Teddy Award Winner/Berlin International Film Festival – Hard Paint), Martín Rodríguez Redondo (Marilyn), Jay Brannan (Shortbus), Jamie Babbit (But I’m a Cheerleader), Angela Robinson (D.E.B.S.), Cheryl Dunye (The Watermelon Woman), Mark Christopher (54), Alantė Kavaitė (The Summer of Sangailė), Daniel Ribeiro (The Way He Looks), Melanie Mayron (Snapshots), Madeleine Olnek (Wild Nights with Emily), Thom Fitzgerald (The Hanging Garden); international trans activists and performers: Buck Angel, Gigi Gorgeous, Miss Rosewood, Zazie de Paris, Maya Jafer and many more.

Opening Night Films

 2006 - Mysterious Skin
 2007 - The Gymnast
 2008 - FD Tel Aviv
 2009 - Strella
 2010 - I Love you Phillip Morris
 2011 - Melting Away
 2012 - Leave It on the Floor
 2013 - Snails in The Rain
 2014 - Guttman X 5 
 2015 - Fresno
 2016 - Oriented
 2017 - The Wound
 2018 - My Days of Mercy
 2019 - 15 Years

Selected films, screened at festival 
 Mysterious Skin. Directed by Greg Araki
 One Kiss. Directed by Ivan Cotroneo
 The Wound. Directed by John Trengove

Controversies

Funding 2012  
The Israeli Film Council threatened to withdraw funding for the festival; however it didn't cancel the funding.

Calls for boycott

2017 
A number of scheduled speakers canceled their attendance at the event in response to pressure from the BDS movement. The speakers who withdrew their participation are South African director John Trengrove, Canadian author and screenwriter of Pakistani descent Fawzia Mirza, Palestinian Nadia Ibrahim, who was supposed to sit in a jury panel, and Swiss Jasna Fritzi Bauer, though only Trengrove, Mirza and Ibrahim cited the BDS movement. Jasna Fritzi Bauer and Helene Hegemann claimed schedule clashes as a reason for cancellation. Despite speakers withdrawal, there were not changes in the screen program and the films of those who cancelled their participation were shown during the festival. John Trengrove cancelled his participation after he arrived to Israel on festival dime. Palestinian Israeli actress Samira Saraya and filmmaker Maysaloun Hamoud participated in the festival.

2020 
More than 100 filmmakers from 15 countries signed a petition launched by the Palestinian Campaign for the Academic and Cultural Boycott of Israel calling for a boycott of the festival out of solidarity with the struggle by the Palestinian queer community. Among the signatories are filmmakers Charlotte Prodger, Alain Guiraudie, Thomas Allen Harris, Harjant Gill, Ian Iqbal Rashid, Sarah Schulman, John Greyson, Adrian Stimson, Richard Fung, Catherine Gund and Raquel Freire, as well as film scholars Alexandra Juhasz, Thomas Waugh, Marc Siegel, Shohini Ghosh and Chris Berry.

2021 
In October 2021, over 200 celebrities, including Mila Kunis, Billy Porter, Neil Patrick Harris, Helen Mirren, Lance Bass and Jeremy Piven, signed an open letter rejecting calls for a boycott of the Tel Aviv International LGBT Film Festival.

References

External links 
 

Film festivals in Israel
LGBT culture in Tel Aviv
LGBT film festivals
LGBT events in Israel
Festivals in Tel Aviv
LGBT-related controversies in film